Vladimír Coufal (born 22 August 1992) is a Czech professional footballer who plays as a defender for Premier League club West Ham United and the Czech Republic national team. He has previously played for Bílovec, Hlučín, Opava, Slovan Liberec and Slavia Prague.

Club career
Coufal began his career at local club Baník Ostrava, playing in the club's academy, before being released at the age of 17 as he was considered to be too small. In 2009, following his release from Baník Ostrava, Coufal joined amateur club ŠSK Bílovec. He believed Banik had destroyed his opportunity to become a professional footballer and described his time with Bílovec as playing "with 40-year-old men. These guys played for sausages and beer after the game, just to drink after work".

Hlučín 
Coufal began his professional career with Hlučín, making his debut against Dukla Prague in September 2010 in 2. Liga just after his 18th birthday. During the 2010–11 season, Coufal made 14 appearances for the club.

Opava (loan) 
Coufal spent the 2011–12 season on loan with 2. Liga club Opava where he made 13 appearances and scored one goal for the club.

Slovan Liberec 
After impressing in the second division with Hlučín and Opava, Coufal was signed by Czech First League club Slovan Liberec in 2012, following a trial with Sparta Prague, who saw Coufal as a replacement for the outgoing Ondřej Kušnír, who had joined Liberec himself in the summer of 2012. Despite playing for Sparta Prague in a pre-season friendly against Viktoria Žižkov, Sparta opted to sign Pablo Gil over Coufal.

During his first season with Liberec, Coufal played in ten league games. In his second season with the team, the 2013–14 season, Coufal became a regular for the team featuring in 21 matches. Over the next three seasons, Coufal played consistently, making 57 league appearances, with a further 8 cup appearances, for Liberec.

Coufal's last season for Liberec, was arguably his most impressive. He made 30 appearances for the club and scored two goals, these performances also earned him a call up and debut to the Czech national team. Coufal was with the Slovan Liberec for six seasons, making more than 150 appearances and playing in the team which won the Czech Cup in 2015. During Coufal's time at Liberec, he was made club captain.

SK Slavia Prague 
Coufal's impressive displays at Slovan Liberec earned him a move to one of the Czech Republic's largest clubs, Slavia Prague, following protracted interest from rivals Sparta Prague. On 1 July 2018, Coufal joined Slavia Prague on a three-year contract, for a reported fee of 18 million Kč. Upon his move to Slavia Prague, Coufal was reunited with manager Jindřich Trpišovský, with whom he played under at Slovan Liberec.

During the 2018–19 season, Coufal made 28 appearances for the Slavia Prague, scoring 3 goals and helping lead the team to the Czech First League title. The next season, during the 2019–20 campaign, he made a further 32 appearances and scored another three goals in season that was suspended for two months, due to the COVID-19 pandemic. During this season, Coufal and Slavia Prague retained the Czech First League title. During the 2020–21 season, Coufal made 5 appearances for Slavia Prague before transferring to West Ham United and the Premier League, playing his last game for the club in a 4–1 UEFA Champions League qualification loss against Danish club Midtjylland.

West Ham United 
On 2 October 2020, Coufal joined West Ham United for a fee of £5.4 million, signing a three-year deal, reuniting with fellow Czech and former Slavia Prague teammate Tomáš Souček, following interest from fellow Premier League clubs Brighton & Hove Albion and Southampton. He made his West Ham debut in a 3–0 win against Leicester City on 4 October 2020. Coufal created seven assists for West Ham during his first season in English football, one behind Aaron Cresswell. The pair created more assists than any other Premier League full-back duo in the 2020–21 season. Coufal finished runner-up in West Ham's Hammer of the Year award for the 2020–21 season, behind compatriot Souček.

International career
In 2014, Coufal made two appearances for the Czech Republic under-21 side.

He made his debut for the Czech Republic national team on 11 November 2017 in a friendly against Qatar. On 4 September 2020, Coufal scored his first goal for the Czech Republic, scoring the opening goal in a 3–1 UEFA Nations League group game against neighbours Slovakia. He was a member of the Czech Republic squad for Euro 2020 which was eliminated in the quarter-finals by Denmark. On 16 November 2021, Coufal captained the Czech Republic for the first time, in a 2–0 World Cup qualification game against Estonia.

Personal life
Coufal was born in the village of Ludgeřovice. Coufal's mother, Alena Dřevjaná, represented the Czechoslovak gymnastic team at the 1988 Summer Olympics. Coufal's siblings, Petr and Jana, are both figure skaters.

Career statistics

Club

International

Scores and results list Czech Republic's goal tally first.

Honours

Club
Slavia Prague
 Czech First League: 2018–19, 2018–19, 2020–21
 Czech Cup: 2018–19

Individual
 Silver Medal of Jan Masaryk: 2021

References

External links
 Vladimír Coufal at West Ham United F.C. (archive)
 
 
 
 
 
 

1992 births
Living people
People from Opava District
Czech footballers
Czech Republic under-21 international footballers
Czech Republic international footballers
Czech National Football League players
Czech First League players
FC Hlučín players
SFC Opava players
FC Slovan Liberec players
Association football defenders
SK Slavia Prague players
Sportspeople from Ostrava
West Ham United F.C. players
Premier League players
UEFA Euro 2020 players
Czech expatriate footballers
Czech expatriate sportspeople in England
Expatriate footballers in England